Gorodenka Stream is a stream in Alutaguse Parish, Ida-Viru County, Estonia. The river joins the Narva river on its left side  from the mouth of Lake Peipus.

Course
Gorodenka is an 18.5 kilometer long forest stream and it flows towards the east. It runs through a drained forest area, straight dug and gutted. Despite that, the ditch flows along rocky outcrops in some places. Halfway, it reaches Puhatu swamp and Kaseso and Laukaso, between which it passes. After the marshes, it continues to the source Kuningaküla. The mouth of the ditch is like a tributary of the Narva river.

References

Rivers of Estonia
Alutaguse Parish